The year 571 BC was a year of the pre-Julian Roman calendar. In the Roman Empire, it was known as year 183 Ab urbe condita. The denomination 571 BC for this year has been used since the early medieval period, when the Anno Domini calendar era became the prevalent method in Europe for naming years.

Events
 November 25—Servius Tullius, king of Rome, celebrates his victory over the Etruscans with a Roman triumph.
 Zhou ling wang replaces King Jian of Zhou as king of the Chinese Zhou Dynasty.

Births

Deaths

References